Xanthorrhoea malacophylla is a species of grasstree of the genus Xanthorrhoea. It is endemic to New South Wales,  Australia. Mature plants form a single or branched trunk that ranges between 2 and 6 metres in height. The grass-like leaves, which are usually around 3 mm wide, are distinguished from other species by their softness and sponginess. The flowers appear between May and September in scapes  that are between 1.3 and 1.8 metres long.

The species was first formally described in 1986 based on plant material collected in 1964 from Queens Lake State Forest near Kew. It occurs on steep hillsides in coastal ranges between Wyong and Casino.

References

malacophylla
Asparagales of Australia
Flora of New South Wales